Mamoun or Mamun may refer to
Mamoun (name)
Mamoun University for Science and Technology in Syria 
Pol Mamun, a village in Iran

See also 
 Al-Ma'mun (disambiguation)